Mighty Joe Young (also known as Mr. Joseph Young of Africa and The Great Joe Young) is a 1949 American black and white fantasy film distributed by RKO Radio Pictures and produced by the same creative team responsible for King Kong (1933). Produced by Merian C. Cooper, who wrote the story, and Ruth Rose, who wrote the screenplay, the film was directed by Ernest B. Schoedsack and stars Robert Armstrong (who appears in both films), Terry Moore, and Ben Johnson in his first credited screen role. Animation effects were handled by Ray Harryhausen, Pete Peterson and Marcel Delgado.

Mighty Joe Young tells the story of a young woman, Jill Young, living on her father's ranch in Africa, who has raised the title character, a large gorilla, from an infant and years later brings him to Hollywood seeking her fortune in order to save the family homestead. It was later adapted into a film in 1998 with Charlize Theron and Bill Paxton.

Plot

In 1937 Tanganyika territory, Africa, eight-year-old Jill Young is living with her father on his ranch. While in her yard, two Africans come by with an orphaned baby gorilla; Jill so wants a pet that she trades her toys and money for him, vowing to always care for the gorilla.

Twelve years later, Max O'Hara and sidekick Gregg are on a trip to Africa looking for animals to headline in O'Hara's new Hollywood nightclub. When a caged lion bites Joe's fingers, he goes on a rampage. Visualizing Joe as their big nightclub attraction, Max and Gregg try to rope him, but he throws both men from their horses and breaks free of their ropes. A grown Jill Young arrives, calming Joe down. She is furious with both men and storms off with Joe.

Both later meet with Jill, and Gregg becomes hopelessly smitten with her. Having now calmed down, Jill hears out Max's nightclub proposal, as Gregg also tries to dissuade her. Max tells her that she and Joe will be a huge Hollywood hit and will be rich within weeks. Needing the proffered income, she agrees to take Joe to Hollywood.

On the crowded opening night, on stage Joe lifts a large platform above his head, holding Jill playing Beautiful Dreamer on a grand piano. Following that, Joe has a tug of war with "the 10 strongest men in the world", which he easily wins. Famous Italian heavyweight boxer Primo Carnera tries to box with him, but Joe playfully tosses him into the audience; laughter follows.

Joe's popularity grows, and by the 10th week he is Hollywood's biggest nightclub attraction. Joe and Jill, however, are beginning to miss Africa; Jill tells Max and Gregg that she is having second thoughts. Gregg tries to convince Max to let them go, but thinking only about more profit, he is able to talk her into staying.

By the 17th week, Joe is miserable; he has grown tired of performing and is homesick. To make matters worse, his next act is a humiliating performance playing an organ grinder with Jill, acting as a little girl, turning the handle. When a thrown bottle strikes Joe, his rage surfaces, roaring at the crowd, while Jill shouts for the audience to stop. Later, during dinner, Gregg and Jill express their feelings for one another, with Gregg agreeing to return with her to Africa.

In his cage, an unhappy Joe tries to ignore three drunks who have sneaked backstage; they offer Joe an open whiskey bottle, and he becomes intoxicated after two more open bottles are consumed. Taunting him, the drunks burn Joe's fingers with a cigarette lighter. Roaring with pain and rage, he breaks out, smashing through a nearby wall and wrecking the nightclub's interior. He also smashes the glass of the lion habitat, allowing the lions to escape into the crowded nightclub, where Joe beats down several of them. Jill and Gregg return and find the nightclub in chaos. Jill manages to get Joe back to his cage, while arriving police shoot the remaining lions.

A court decree orders Joe be shot, and Jill's pleas to save his life are denied. Gregg, O'Hara, and Jill devise a plan to get Joe out of California using a moving van, then a cargo ship. When Joe's executioners arrive, they find his cage empty and themselves locked inside the nightclub. As the van is leaving, Joe is spotted by an itinerant worker, who is later questioned by police. On the way to the ship, police spot the moving van and give chase, but Joe has been cleverly transferred to a covered truck; the moving van, driven by Max, is just a decoy. The police eventually stop the van and arrest Max.

Driven by Gregg and carrying Joe and Jill, the truck gets stuck in heavy mud. With Jill's encouragement, Joe pushes the truck free, and the police then get stuck in the same mud as the truck drives away while Joe taunts the police. Before reaching port, they witness a tall orphanage engulfed in flames.

Jill and Gregg help the caretakers save the children. They escort most of the children, but the flames spread quickly, and a last group, along with Jill and Gregg, are trapped on the top story. At Jill's urging, Joe braves the raging fire by climbing an adjacent tall tree, carrying Jill to safety, while Gregg lowers each child by rope to the ground. One child is left behind, so Joe climbs up again, grabbing the frightened and crying little girl, then he and Gregg climb down. A wall of the burning orphanage collapses as they near the ground, nearly killing Joe as he shields the little girl from the falling wall. Max assures Jill that, because of Joe's heroism, his life will now be spared.

Much later, Max receives home movies from his friends. Jill and Gregg are now married and living on their ranch with Joe, who has made it safely back to Africa. Joe waves "goodbye," along with Jill and Gregg, to Max.

Cast
 Terry Moore as Jill Young
 Ben Johnson as Gregg
 Robert Armstrong as Max O'Hara
 Frank McHugh as Windy
 Douglas Fowley as Jones
 Denis Green as Crawford
 Paul Guilfoyle as Smith
 Nestor Paiva as Brown
 Regis Toomey as John Young
 Lora Lee Michel as Jill Young, as a girl
 James Flavin as Schultz
 Primo Carnera appears as himself
 Phil Olafsson as The Swedish Angel

Uncredited performances with dialogue:
 Charles Lane as producer
 Irene Ryan as Southern belle at the bar
 William Schallert as gas station attendant
 Ellen Corby as nurse at the burning orphanage

Production
Willis O'Brien, who created the animation for King Kong, was the supervisor of the film's stop-motion animation special effects. Ray Harryhausen was hired in 1947 on his first film assignment as an assistant animator to O'Brien. O'Brien, however, ended up concentrating on solving the various technical problems of the production, delegating most of the actual animation to Harryhausen; Pete Peterson and Marcel Delgado also animated a few sequences in the film.

The models (constructed by Kong's builder Marcel Delgado) and animation are more sophisticated than in King Kong, containing more subtle gestures and even some comedic elements, such as a chase scene where Joe is riding in the back of a speeding truck and spits at his pursuers. Despite the increased technical sophistication, this film, like King Kong, features some serious scale issues, with Joe noticeably changing size between many shots (the title character is not supposed to be as large as Kong, perhaps 10–12 feet tall). Harryhausen attributed these lapses to producer Cooper, who insisted Joe appear larger in some scenes for dramatic effect.

Buoyed by the enormous success of King Kong in 1933 and its profitable theatrical reissues in 1938, 1942, and 1946, RKO had great hopes for Mighty Joe Young. Upon its release in 1949, the film was honored with an Academy Award for Special Effects (a category that did not exist in 1933 for King Kong). The film was unsuccessful at the box office and recorded a loss of $675,000. As a result, plans to produce a sequel (tentatively titled Joe Meets Tarzan) were quickly dropped.

The film has become a stop-motion animation classic. Special effects artists consider it highly influential, with the elaborate orphanage rescue sequence lauded as one of the great stop-motion sequences in film history. It was remade in 1998 with Charlize Theron playing Jill, Bill Paxton as Greg, and creature suit performer John Alexander as the title character. Joe was created through a mixture of gorilla suits and full-sized animatronics created by Rick Baker and digital effects by DreamQuest Images and Industrial Light & Magic.

Reception
Film critic Thomas M. Pryor in his review for The New York Times said that Merian Cooper and Ernest Schoedsack, as producer and director, "... are endeavoring to make all the world love, or at the very least feel a deep sympathy for, their monstrous, mechanical gorilla". The review in Variety had a similar opinion: "Mighty Joe Young is fun to laugh at and with, loaded with incredible corn, plenty of humor, and a robot gorilla who becomes a genuine hero. The technical skill of the large staff of experts (led by Willis O’Brien and Ray Harryhausen) gives the robot life".

Awards
Mighty Joe Young won the Academy Award for Best Visual Effects; the only other nominee that year was the film Tulsa. At the time, the rules of the Academy dictated that the producer of the winning film receive the Oscar. However, in recognition of his work on this picture and on King Kong, producer Merian C. Cooper presented the award to Willis O'Brien.

Mighty Joe Young exhibition
A rare album featuring original artwork and documentary photographs of the production was first publicly displayed in the exhibition Recapturing Mighty Joe Young: The Movie! The Memory!! The Make-believe!!! (School of Art, Aberystwyth University, UK, 20 Nov. 2017 – 2 Feb. 2018). The album commemorates the collaborative efforts that earned Mighty Joe Young an Academy Award for Special Effects. Showing off the tools and tricks of the trade, it contains behind-the-scenes photographs as well as production stills, drawings, and watercolor paintings by Willis "Obie" O’Brien, the film’s "Technical Creator". The album also records the work of Obie’s apprentice, Ray Harryhausen, whose name became synonymous with pre-CGI fantasy film and stop-motion animation. The album was bequeathed to Aberystwyth University by the film historian Raymond Durgnat (1932–2002).

Also featured in the exhibition was a board, signed in January 1948, by forty-five members of the cast and crew. However, as curator and art historian Harry Heuser points out, "[n]ot all of the names listed here appear in the credits on screen. Some have never been associated with the film". The board, illustrated by Disney cartoonist Scotty Whitaker, is a "unique record of a production underway".

The exhibition opened in November 2017 with a presentation from The Ray and Diana Harryhausen Foundation's collections manager Connor Heaney. He presented a history of the film's production and surviving models and artworks held in the Foundation's archive, before introducing a screening of the movie.

See also
 Mighty Joe Young, 1998 remake
 King Kong 
 List of stop motion films
 List of American films of 1949
 List of fictional primates
 King Kong

Citations

General sources 

 Harryhausen, Ray. Film Fantasy Scrapbook. New York: A. S. Barnes, 1974. 
 Harryhausen, Ray, and Ray Dalton. The Art of Ray Harryhausen. New York: Watson-Guptil, 2008.

External links

 
 
 
 
 

1940s fantasy films
1940s monster movies
1949 films
Films set in 1937
American black-and-white films
American fantasy films
Fictional gorillas
Films about gorillas
Films directed by Ernest B. Schoedsack
Films scored by Roy Webb
Films set in Africa
Films set in California
Films that won the Best Visual Effects Academy Award
Films using stop-motion animation
1940s English-language films
1940s American films
Films set in nightclubs